This is a list of haunted attractions, which are live entertainment venues that simulate the experience of visiting haunted locations or storylines typical of horror fiction.

Simulated haunted houses/mansions/castles

Year-round

Seasonal

Haunted theme park attractions

Defunct attractions

References 

Halloween events
Haunted attractions (simulated)
Entertainment lists